Energy Department is a department of Government of Punjab, Pakistan. The department is responsible for regulation and policy formulation regarding power sector. After passing of 18th Amendment, provinces are fully powered to develop power projects through public or private sector.

The department is headed by Minister in charge democratically  and  a secretary at bureaucratic level, who is assisted by an additional secretary and four deputy secretaries.

Power Projects 
As of May 2012, there are more than 52 projects under development of around 1400 MW.

Attached Departments

Punjab Power Development Board 
Punjab Power Development Board (PPDB) provides One-Window facility to promote private sector participation in power generation.

Punjab Power Development Company Limited 
Company to develop power projects in Public-Private Partnership.

Punjab Power Management Unit 
Punjab Power Management Unit (PPMU) has been established to plan, procure and implement the ADB funded Renewable Energy Projects.

See also 

 Quaid-e-Azam Solar Park
 Ministry of Water and Power
 Electricity sector in Pakistan
 Energy policy of Pakistan

References

External links
 Energy Department

Departments of Government of Punjab, Pakistan
Energy in Punjab, Pakistan
Energy ministries